Launi is a given name. Notable people with the name include:

Launi Meili (born 1963), American sports shooter
Launi Skinner (born 1964), Canadian business woman

See also
Launis